Cape Cod Regional Technical High School, also known as Cape Tech, Cape Cod Tech, Lower Cape Tech, and sometimes abbreviated as CCT, is a public vocational and technical high school located in Harwich, Massachusetts, United States.

Cape Cod Regional Technical High School was founded in 1975. The school accepts students from the towns of Mashpee, Barnstable, Yarmouth, Harwich, Dennis, Chatham, Brewster, Orleans, Eastham, Wellfleet, Truro and Provincetown. Cape Cod Tech is located just off Route 6 in Harwich at Exit 82.

The school has an approximate enrollment of 650+ students in grades 9–12. The previous school building has been closed and demolished to make way for a new building, which was scheduled to be opened after the 2019–2020 school year, but partially closed due to the COVID-19 Pandemic. The Current building has been operating since.

Sports

Cape Cod Tech is part of the Massachusetts Interscholastic Athletic Association and fields many varsity sports. The school's team name is Crusaders and the school's colors are maroon and gold. Cape Tech offers many sports programs. They are football, golf, cheerleading, cross-country, volleyball, boys' soccer, girls' soccer,  boys' ice hockey, girls' ice hockey, boys' basketball, girls' basketball,  baseball, softball, lacrosse, track and field, and tennis. Cape Cod Tech's ice hockey team began a co-op program with Cape Cod Academy in the 2009–2010 season.

Cape Cod Tech experienced much success in the early 2000s in football. Under coach David Currid, the football team has participated in Eastern Massachusetts Championship games in 2000 and in 2006. In 2000, they lost to Georgetown. In 2006, the team went 9–1 in the regular season, with the lone loss coming at the hands of Mashpee, 12–0. They then defeated West Roxbury 35–27 in the first round of the playoffs to earn a berth in the Division 3A Super Bowl, where they lost a 7-0 heartbreaker to Ipswich. Year in and year out, the football team competed for the Mayflower Large League title.

In 2010, the MIAA voted to end the cooperative football program between Harwich High School and Cape Cod Tech, because Cape Cod Tech has enough players to run a football program on its own. Since 2011, the Cape Cod Tech will always play Upper Cape Cod Regional Technical High School on the annual Thanksgiving Day game.

In the 2013–2014 boys' hockey season, Cape Cod Tech had much success. Finishing with a record of (15–4–1) .775, Cape Cod Tech/Cape Cod Academy were the number 1 seed in the MIAA South Division 3 Tournament. Although they suffered a loss to Abbington, the Crusaders held their heads up high on their season's accomplishment.

The athletic facilities at Cape Cod Tech have not been host to just the school's own activities. In 1988, the Brewster Whitecaps, of the Cape Cod Baseball League, were founded. From their inception in 1988 until 2005, the Whitecaps played their home games on the grounds of this school. Cape Cod Tech, in conjunction with the Whitecaps, hosted the CCBL All Star Game in 2000. Brewster also managed to win the League Championship that season.

In the 2018-19 boys' soccer season, Cape Cod Tech had much success during a season of change, after moving to the Mayflower Small League of the Mayflower Athletic Conference, District D- MIAA, earlier during the 2017–18 season. With a record of (12-7-2), they gave CCT the best soccer season since the championship run of 2000–2003, and the best season with coach Ivan Popov. They won the Mayflower League when they beat Sacred Heart in the first round 3–2, and then beat Nantucket in a quarter final match 2–1. They ended their season with a loss against Atlantis Charter 5–1, but still managed to provide an impressive record for their first Mayflower playoff run, with a record of (9-0-1). 
Coach Ivan Popov was then named the Mayflower League Coach of the Year, and player Rick Goncalves was named Player of the Year.

Current sports offered
These sports are currently offered at Cape Cod Regional Technical High School as of January 2020.  A majority of the sports offered to students at CCT are for both boys and girls, as required by Title IX of the Education Amendments of 1972.
 Football
 Volleyball
 Lacrosse
 Tennis
 Track and field
 Softball
 Ice hockey
 Soccer
 Basketball
 Cross-country
 Cheerleading
 Golf
 Wrestling

Former sports offered
 Rowing
 Lacrosse (Girls)

Vocational shop programs

Current vocational shops
Cape Cod Tech currently offers 15 shop programs to students, which are as follows:
 Auto Collision Technology
 Automotive Technology
 Carpentry
 Cosmetology
 Culinary Arts
 Dental Assisting
 Electrical
 Engineering
 Design and Visual Communication
 Health Technology
 Horticulture
 Heating, Ventilation & Air Conditioning
 Information Technology
 Marine Services Technology
 Plumbing

Former shops

 Hotel, Restaurant, and Business Management, replaced by Engineering.
 Distributive Education
 Painting and Decorating
 Masonry
 Fashion
 Early Childhood Education
 Metal Fabrication & Welding
 Commercial Fishing
 Banking
 Welding

Technical competitions

Each year, students at Cape Cod Tech have the opportunity to participate in various technical competitions. For example, students in the Horticulture program have the opportunity to participate in Future Farmers of America competitions, and students in the Hotel, Restaurant, and Business Management program may participate in DECA. Students enrolled in all other CCT technical programs may participate in SkillsUSA which hosts district, state, and national competitions between technical schools for students to show what they have learned. Carol Olsen, a Graphic Arts instructor, organizes Cape Cod Tech's involvement in SkillsUSA.

Renewable energy

Cape Cod Tech offers a recycling program called the "Green Beings", which was started in 2005. The school is also home to a Renewable Energy Center (REC). Construction on the REC building was completed in the spring of 2009, and the grand opening for the facility took place in October 2009.

Radio station

Cape Cod Tech holds the license for a radio station, WCCT-FM 90.3, which broadcast actively from 1989 to 2014. It primarily rebroadcast WBUR-FM in Boston, though it did produce student-run programming for most of its history.

See also
 National FFA Organization

References

External links
 Official School Web Site
 Cape Cod Tech Renewable Energy Center
 SkillsUSA Massachusetts

1975 establishments in Massachusetts
Educational institutions established in 1975
Harwich, Massachusetts
Public high schools in Massachusetts
Technical schools